Mirosław Justek (23 September 1948 in Słupsk – 24 January 1998 in Poznań) was a Polish football player.

Club career
He played mostly for Pogoń Szczecin and Lech Poznań. He later went to Belgium, where he played for Royal Antwerp, Charleroi and Libramont.

International career
He was capped three times for the Polish national team and was in the reserve for the 1978 FIFA World Cup.

References

1948 births
1998 deaths
Sportspeople from Słupsk
Polish footballers
Polish expatriate footballers
Poland international footballers
1978 FIFA World Cup players
Pogoń Szczecin players
Lech Poznań players
Royal Antwerp F.C. players
R. Charleroi S.C. players
Ekstraklasa players
Expatriate footballers in Belgium
Association football defenders